The Galeria Kaskada is a shopping centre in Szczecin, Poland, located at 36 Niepodległości Avenue. The building was opened on 28 September 2011, and belongs to the ECE Polska company.

History 
The building was built in place of three other buildings. They were: the Odra Clothing Industry Factory, the Pleciuga Puppet Theatre building, and the Kaskada Restaurant Complex. The last on the list burned down on 27 April 1981, and became the namesake of the shopping center.

The construction had been commissioned by ECE Polska company, with the building being designed by Urbicon architect company, and constructed by Strabag Polska. The investment costed 180 000 000 euro. The construction begun in 2008, and lasted until 2011. The building had been opened to the public on 28 September 2011.

During the earthwork, the remains of the 18th century retaining wall of the city fortification, were found. Following the renovation, the best preserved fragments of the wall, were exposed in the shopping centre interion, in the underground section.

Description 
The building is designed in a modern architecture style. It consists of three rotundas, with dome roofs. Each rotunda has a different colour, each representing a different building that used to exist in the location of the shopping center. They are, blue, repressing jeans manufactured in the Odra Clothing Industry Factory, red, representing the curtain in the Pleciuga Puppet Theatre, and yellow, representing the champagne and parties in the Kaskada Restaurant Complex. The shape of the building is based on the Kaskada Restaurant Complex.

The shopping center hosts 140 stores, a gym, a charging station, and a car wash. It has five above-ground levels, and one level underground. The building also has a multi-story car park, with 1,000 car spaces.

External links 
 Official website

References 

Buildings and structures in Szczecin
Shopping malls in Szczecin
Shopping malls established in 2011
2011 establishments in Poland